NYM or Nym may refer to:

Fictional characters
Corporal Nym, in Shakespeare's plays Henry V and The Merry Wives of Windsor, as well as other works
Nymeria Sand or "Lady Nym", in the A Song of Ice and Fire novel series and the Game of Thrones television series
Nym, an alien pirate in Star Wars video games; see 
The Nym, a race of sentient plants in The Wheel of Time fantasy book series
Nym, from the Forgotten Realms setting of Dungeons & Dragons
Nym, in the role-playing video game Black Sigil: Blade of the Exiled

NYM
New York Mets, a Major League Baseball team
New York Magic, an American women’s soccer team
New York Methodist Hospital, Brooklyn, New York
Nigerian Youth Movement
Northern Yearly Meeting, an American Quaker organization
North York Moors, a national park in the United Kingdom
 NYM-J or NYM-O kinds of cabel which is in Germany used for domestic wiring today. -J means with eart wire -O without eart wire

Other uses
-nym, a suffix for many English nouns
Nym Crinkle (1835 –1903), American newspaper writer, author and drama critic
Karl Marx's nickname for his housekeeper Helene
Nadym Airport (IATA:NYM), Russia